Tell Me This Is a Dream is the fourth studio album by American vocal group The Delfonics. It was released via Philly Groove Records in 1972. It peaked at number 123 on the Billboard 200 chart.

Track listing

Charts

References

External links
 

1972 albums
The Delfonics albums
Albums recorded at Sigma Sound Studios
Philly Groove Records albums